The Hârboca is a right tributary of the river Câlnău in Romania. It flows into the Câlnău in Vadu Sorești.

References

Rivers of Romania
Rivers of Buzău County